Jervaulx railway station was a railway station in Newton-le-Willows, North Yorkshire, England. Reputedly the Marquess of Aylesbury was upset by many of his guests arriving at the wrong destination.

History
Opened by the Bedale and Leyburn Railway, the station was initially directly south of the crossroads in the village, but was moved further west on its main site in 1862 at a cost of £38,000. The Wensleydale railway was taken over by the North Eastern Railway, which became part of the London and North Eastern Railway during the Grouping of 1923. The line then passed on to the Eastern Region of British Railways on nationalisation in 1948. It was then closed by the British Transport Commission in April 1954 (along with all of the other stations on the route) when the Northallerton to Hawes passenger service was withdrawn. However, as the line remained open for freight, the station was used after official closure by pupils from the nearby Aysgarth School.

The site today
Track still passes through the station site, providing rail access for the Wensleydale Railway which operates west from Leeming Bar. The station building still stands and is used as a private dwelling; trains on the Wensleydale Railway do not stop here.

References

External links
 Jervaulx station on navigable 1947 O. S. map

Disused railway stations in North Yorkshire
Railway stations in Great Britain opened in 1856
Railway stations in Great Britain closed in 1954
Former North Eastern Railway (UK) stations
Wensleydale